Preloved.co.uk is a classified advertising website based in the UK. It was founded by Ian Buzer in 1998 and bought by The Hut Group in 2014.

History
Preloved was founded by Ian Buzer in 1998. Initially for second-hand and vintage items, it became of the largest sites for advertising pets, horses and livestock. In 2012, it was ranked 2nd in the UK for classified ads by Hitwise. In 2013, it recorded over 1.1 billion page views on its advert pages. As of 2014, Preloved was the largest independent classified ads site in the UK. 

In March 2014, Moo Ltd, the owner of Preloved.co.uk, was bought by The Hut Group.

In July 2015, Preloved launched its first ever mobile app for iOS focused on Apple's iPhone market. An Android version  was launched on 3 November 2015.

Business model
Preloved has no listing or selling fees. But users can pay to get their advertisements more exposure. It has over 10 million members and hundreds of thousands of adverts in over 500 categories.

Advertisements which have been created in the last twelve days are initially reserved only for upgraded buyers but they become available to all after the twelve days. For business sellers, Preloved requires users to maintain a monthly business membership.

References

THG (company)
Online marketplaces of the United Kingdom
Classified advertising websites
Internet properties established in 1998